Michael Schelle (pronounced Shelley), born January 22, 1950, in Philadelphia, is a composer of contemporary concert music. He is also a performer, conductor, author, and teacher.

Background
Schelle grew up in Bergen County, in northern New Jersey, where he studied piano and conducting with Walter Schroeder. After receiving a pre-collegiate certificate from the Trinity College of Music in London, he changed direction for a B.A. in theatre and philosophy from Villanova University (PA). During his four years at Villanova, Schelle was the keyboard player in various regional rock bands, and also Composer in Residence for the Villanova Graduate Theatre, scoring productions of Waiting for Godot, Rhinoceros, and other modernist classics directed by Irene Baird and David Rabe.

Returning to music after Villanova, with eyes now opened wide by discovering experimental theatre, the avant garde, and the music of Igor Stravinsky, Béla Bartók, Charles Ives, Frank Zappa, Edgard Varese, Karlheinz Stockhausen, Krzysztof Penderecki and John Cage, Schelle went on to receive graduate composition degrees from the Hartt School of Music (Connecticut) and the University of Minnesota. Schelle studied composition with Arnold Franchetti, Aaron Copland, Paul Fetler, and Dominick Argento.

Commissions
Schelle's music has been commissioned and / or performed by over 350 orchestras, symphonic bands and professional chamber ensembles across the US and abroad including the Detroit Symphony, the Minnesota Orchestra, Chicago Symphony, Buffalo Philharmonic, Cincinnati Symphony, Milwaukee Symphony, Louisville Orchestra, Indianapolis Symphony, Nashville Symphony, Albany (NY) Symphony, Springfield (Mass) Symphony, Dayton Philharmonic, Honolulu Symphony, Kansas City Symphony, Greenwich (CT) Chorus and Orchestra, Manhattan Chamber Orchestra, Saint Paul Chamber Orchestra, Cleveland Chamber Symphony . . . . also, XTET (Los Angeles), ISIS (Austin, TX), Voices of Change ensemble, the Pittsburgh New Music Ensemble, the Urban Quartet (Phoenix) , the Eastman New Music Ensemble, the Indiana University New Music Ensemble and many others.

Recent international performances of his music have included Kammerorkester Basel (Switzerland), Czestochowa Philharmonic (Poland), Kremlin Chamber Orchestra, St. Petersburg Chamber Philharmonic, Warsaw Chamber Opera, Brno Philharmonic (Czech Republic), Orquestra Sinfonica Nacional (Costa Rica), the Vale of Glamorgan Music Festival (Cardiff, Wales), Firenza New Music Festival (Italy), the Koenig Ensemble of London and the Kuala Lumpur (Malaysia) Performing Arts Center Wind Symphony.
Schelle is the author of the 1999 film music book, The Score (Silman-James Press, Los Angeles).
Schelle is the featured composer in the 2005 documentary, "Extreme Orchestra" IMDb 
Three (3) extended "Composer in Residence" appointments in Japan: Nagoya Imperial University and Aichi Prefectural University of Music and Fine Arts https://web.archive.org/web/20150304180351/http://www.aichi-fam-u.ac.jp/ja/international-exchange/artist-in-residence.html (2009, 2011, 2013)
Two (two) extended "Composer in Residence" appointments in Poland: Kraków Academy of Music (2016, 2019) and Chopin University of Music (Warsaw, 2016, 2019)
Schelle's 2002 Wright Flight piano concerto (recorded on Albany Records with the Dayton Philharmonic, Andrew Russo, piano) was 'on tour' throughout China in January 2010 for multiple performances with the South Shore Orchestra (Chicago) in Shanghai, Beijing, Ningbo and Hangzhou.
Much of Schelle's orchestra and wind ensemble music is published by Lauren Keiser Music Publishing / Keiser Classical, in St. Louis and New York City.

Grants and awards
Schelle has received composition grants and awards from the Rockefeller Foundation, the National Endowment for the Arts, the New York State Arts Council, the New England Foundation for the Arts, the Welsh Arts Council (Cardiff), Arts Midwest, the Great Lakes Arts Alliance, the American Pianists Association, the International Percussive Arts Society, the Barlow Endowment for Music Composition (Utah, 1989), the National Band Association (2012 Revelli Composition Prize) and many other organizations.

In 2005/2006, funded by a grant from the American Symphony Orchestra League, Inc. (NYC), Schelle was Composer in Residence for the Albuquerque Youth Symphony organization , writing a new work for each of the five AYS orchestras. All five works were premiered in May 2006, at Popejoy Hall on the campus of the University of New Mexico.

2007/2008: by way of a generous Individual Artist Grant from the Arts Council of Indianapolis, Schelle enjoyed an extended visit to Japan where he worked with legendary avant garde composer Hifumi Shimoyama (b. 1930) in Tokyo. Schelle also received an ACI grant in 1999/2000.

2023:  Schelle wins the "Crossroads of America" composers competition sponsored by the South Bend (IN) Symphony Orchestra with his "Summit at San Quentin". First Prize includes a commission for a major new orchestral work to be premiered during the SBSO 2023/24 season.

Guest composer
In addition to working with many American orchestras, Schelle is a frequent Guest Composer for American universities and schools of music, where he gives master classes on his music and works with young composers and student ensembles. Among many others, he has been featured for guest composer residencies at Indiana University, CCM, Arizona State University, Washington State University, California Lutheran University, Sam Houston State University. Carnegie Mellon University, Kent State University, Southern Illinois University, University of Louisiana-Lafayette, Eastern Michigan University, State University of New York, University of Notre Dame, Capital University (OH), University of Massachusetts, Trinity University (TX), University of Wisconsin-Madison and many others. He has also held extended residencies at the Spoleto USA Festival (Charleston, SC), the Wolf Trap Center for the Performing Arts (Vienna, VA), the MacDowell Colony, and for various prestigious new music festivals across the US and abroad.

From 2009 to 2013 he served three times as the featured Composer in Residence at both Nagoya Imperial University (Japan) and Aichi Prefectural University of Fine Arts and Music (Japan).

April 2016, May 2019: guest composer / visiting professor at the Chopin University of Music (Warsaw, Poland) and the Krakow Academy of Music.

Schelle's 2014 opera "The End of Al Capone" (music and libretto by Schelle) was premiered in Indianapolis April 2015, and produced in May 2019 by Warsaw Chamber Opera / Chopin University New Music Consortium.

29 December 2022 : Schelle's "Escape from Xishuangbanna", commissioned by the Confucius Institute, is premiered at Carnegie Hall in NYC by the Asian Cultural Symphony Orchestra.

Compositions

Orchestral
   The Fifth Horseman of the Apocalypse (2023)
   Escape from Xishuangbanna (2022)
   Trapped Like Rats (2021)
   The Sixth Dimension of Light (2021), string orchestra
   Summit at San Quentin (2019), chamber orchestra
   Virus (2019)
   Resilience (2015), viola, cello and orchestra
   Sun-Wukong  (2013)
   Through the Bright Lights of Hell  (2013)
   The Exorcism of the Sugar Plum Fairy  (2012)
   Guardian  (2011), solo violin and orchestra
   Rain (2009), soprano and orchestra
   The Beast of Brazil (2005)
   Ear Infection (2005)
   Vox Humana (2005)
   Extraction on No. 8 (2005)
   Chrysalis (2004)
   Crashout (2004)
   Wright Flight (2002), piano concerto
   Samurai (1999)
   Spider Baby (1996)
   Mayday! (1995)
   Spirits (1993), six biographies for orchestra
   Jonestown Echo (Rev. Jim Jones), from Spirits
   Detour to Nowhere (John Dillinger), from Spirits
   Limberlost (Gene Stratton Porter), from Spirits
   One for the Gipper (Knute Rockne), from Spirits
   Ben Bonhommes Rouge (Ezra Pound), from Spirits
   The Last Ride (James Dean), from Spirits
   Blast (1992)
   Rapscallion (1990)
   After the Meridian: Times of Future Passed (1990), for soloists, chorus and orchestra
   The Big Night (1989)
   Kidspeace (1987)
   Concerto for Two Pianos and Orchestra (1986)
   Swashbuckler! (1984)
   Play Us Chastity on Your Violin (1984), for solo violin and chamber orchestra
   Pygmies II (1983)
   Pygmies (1982)
   Masque (1979)
   El Salon Medico (1977)
   Lancaster Variations (1976)Wind Ensemble / Symphonic Band   Hangover Hotel (2020)
   A Far Cry from Fairview (2019)
   O Magma Mysterium (2016)
   Fear Strikes Out (2015), for trombone and wind ensemble
   Extraction on No. 9 (2013)
   The End of the World (2011) - "E.O.W" was the winner of the 2012 National Band Assoc. William D. Revelli Composition Prize
   Prayer (2004), for cello and chamber winds
   When Hell Freezes Over (1996)
   Guttersnipe (1994)
   Contraband (1991)
   Seven Steps from Hell (1985)
   Cliffhanger March (1984)
   King Ubu (1981)Opera / Choral / Vocal   The End of Al Capone (2014), mono-opera for voice and large chamber ensemble
   Ra-ahmen (2010), SATB and four doublebasses
   Aesop Rules (1997), 55:00 musical for kids (grades 1–5), tenor sax, keyboards, percussion
   Pipuff (1992), SATB
   Struwwelpeter (1991), for tenor and piano (or chamber ensemble)
   The Great Soap Opera (1988), 90:00 chamber opera
   Six Seasonal Anthems (1987), SATB, organ
   Dei Angelus (1987), SATB, organ
   Caroleluia (1987), SATB
   Swanwhite (1981), for soprano and piano
   The Wife Wrapt in Wether's Skin (1977), TTBBChamber   Kingfish Levinsky (2023), oboe (or soprano sax), tenor sax and piano
   Kingfish Levinsky  (2023), clarinet, cello and piano
   Fear and Loathing in the Carthusian Monastery at Valldemossa (2022), for 2 pianos (6 hands) and chamber ensemble
   Fear and Loathing in the Carthusian Monastery at Valldemossa (2022), for 2 pianos (6 hands)
   Kurashikku (2021), flute / bass flute, clarinet / bass clarinet and piano
   Jackhammer Heracles  (2021), alto sax (or Bb clarinet) and piano
   Discreet Street  (2021), for double bass and piano
   In the Shame of Her Own Silence (2021), flute, clarinet, violin, cello, piano
   Fünf Verschwörungstheorien  (2021), wind quintet (fl, ob, cl, horn, bsn)
   Stasis at Warp Speed  (2020), clarinet and piano
   Papa Hemingway's Polydactyls  (2020), chamber ensemble
   Hichirikima  (2020), for two cellos
   JUKAI: The Mt. Fuji Suicide Forest (2019), hichiriki and chamber ensemble 
   Summit at San Quentin (2019), large chamber ensemble
   Psalm of these Days (2019), for eight pianos
   The Tragic Paradigm of Miss Mi$-T's Misguided Expectations (2019), chamber ensemble
   The Eisenstein Mummers (2018), chamber ensemble
   Hesitation Killed the Cat (2018), chamber ensemble
   Rosemary's Baby's Accordions (2018), chamber ensemble
   Vorsichtig (2017), guitar duo
   The Illusion of Invincibility (2017), violin and piano
   My Tears Fall Dry (2017), violin and piano
   Chords That Rhyme With Your Eyes (2017), clarinet and piano
   Bury the Hatchet (2017), for guitar quartet
   Tranquilizer (2015), for chamber ensemble
   The Wolves of Parnassus (2014), for chamber ensemble
   Mystic Mourning (2014), for solo violin and chamber ensemble
   Burning Crusaders (2014), for five trumpets and percussion
   Crusher (2013), for solo guitar w/piano accompaniment
   Meine Grossmutter Kostbaren Klarinette (2013), for clarinet and piano
   My Precious Iron Lung (2013), for horn and piano
   My Precious Iron Cello (2013), for euphonium and piano
   Aka Sakana (2012), for solo clarinet
   Their House Was Around Here, Somewhere ... (2012), for piano and chamber ensemble
   Sprechstisambastimme (2011), for string quartet
   Red Knuckles (2011), for clarinet and tenor sax
   Say Goodnight, Gracie (2010), for large chamber ensemble
   Nagoya Spiral (2009), for any four players and pre-recorded medium
   Calhoun (2009), for large chamber ensemble
   The Fall of Susan McClary (2009), for chamber ensemble
   No Child Left Behind (2007), large chamber ensemble
   The Viola the Wind Swept Away (2007), for solo viola (or any instrument) and chamber ensemble
   Heartland (2007), for clarinet, tenor sax, violin, cello, bass, piano and percussion
   Struwwelpeter (2006), for tenor and piano (1991), for tenor and chamber ensemble (2006)
   It's Curtains for You, Bub (2005), for large chamber ensemble
   Prayer (2004), for solo cello with harp and piano
   Gimme Shelter (2001), for violin and piano
   Godzilla (1997) for clarinet, bass clarinet, tenor sax, piano, bass, percussion
   Berlin Archetype (1990) for clarinet, cello, piano (and off-stage trumpet and tenor)
   Inizio (1989), for violin and cello
   Musica Magnetizzare (1988), for five chamber players
   Howl (1986), for solo clarinet and four chamber players
   Play Us Chastity on Your Violin (1984), for solo violin and large chamber ensemble
   Music for the Alabama Kid (1984), for chamber ensemble
   Music for Two Pianos (1982)
   Cry Wolf (1981), for cello and 5 percussionists
   Music for the Last Days of Strindberg (1979), for chamber ensemble
   Chamber Concerto (1978), for solo violin, flute, cello and pianoSolo'   The Case of the Hesitant Heretic (2022), for piano
   Campari (2020), for piano
   Ulterior Motives (2019), for piano
   Fünf Fantasien nach Bach (2011–19), for piano
   Fünf Halluziationen von Beethoven (2016–19), for piano
   Aka Sakana (2012), for solo clarinet
   Straight, No Lithium (2010), nine bipolar preludes for piano
   Janus: Third Sonata (1998), for piano
   Subwoofer (1996), for flute
   Hammerstein (1995), for piano
   Racing With Rabbits (1988), solo percussionist
   Rattlesnake (1983), solo percussionist
   Blue Plate Special (1983), for tuba alone (with aux. percussion)
   Redbud (1982), for double bass
   Second Sonata (1979), for piano

Current
Schelle is Composer in Residence and Founder/Director of the JCFA Composers Orchestra  (new music ensemble) at the School of Music, Butler University, Indianapolis, IN, USA. Schelle's daughter, Katie, is an interior designer and architect with Mitchell Studios in New Haven, CT. His son, Patrick, M.S.W. from NYU, PhD C.U.N.Y., is a social worker with Family Services of Westchester'' in New York City, White Plains and The Bronx. Schelle's wife is pianist, composer, accordionist, teacher Miho Sasaki (b. 1978, Tokyo, Japan)

References
American Composers Alliance NYC 2
Schelle page @ Wind Repertory Project
Michael Schelle, composer
Lauren Keiser Music Publishing / Keiser Classical

External links
Michael Schelle, composer
Schelle page @ Wind Repertory Project
School of Music, Butler University
Pytheas Center for Contemporary Music
Silman-James Press, Los Angeles, CA
California Lutheran University
Wright Flight CD / Albany Records
New York Times, Summer 2012
National Band Association "Revelli Composition Prize"

American male composers
21st-century American composers
University of Minnesota alumni
Living people
Villanova University alumni
University of Hartford Hartt School alumni
Musicians from Philadelphia
1950 births
21st-century American male musicians